Los Velázquez is a 1972 Argentine film.

Cast
 Carlos Lagos
 Oscar Vegas
 Martin Coria
 Noemi Manzano
 Hugo Alvarez
 Guerino Marchesi
 Carlos Catalano
 Ricardo Gil Soria
 Jose Andrada
 Sara Bonet

External links
 

1972 films
Argentine comedy films
1970s Spanish-language films
1970s Argentine films